Slumberland is a 2022 American fantasy adventure film directed by Francis Lawrence and written by David Guion and Michael Handelman. Based on the comic strip Little Nemo in Slumberland by Winsor McCay, the film stars Jason Momoa, Marlow Barkley, Chris O'Dowd, Kyle Chandler, and Weruche Opia. It tells the story of a young girl who goes to live with her uncle after her father is lost at sea and enters Slumberland where she befriends a renegade character who is involved in a plot to get to the Sea of Nightmares and obtain a special pearl that may have the power to reunite her with her father.

Slumberland was released on November 18, 2022, by Netflix. It received generally mixed reviews from critics.

Plot
Nemo is a young girl who lives in a lighthouse with her father Peter ever since her mom died when she was young. Peter teaches Nemo how to maintain the lighthouse and tells her wild bedtime stories about his adventures with a character named Flip and one of their adventures involve the searching for a cave of magical wish-granting pearls.

One day, a storm occurs and Peter heads out to help a distressed boat. Nemo has a nightmare of her underwater as Peter is snatched by a squid-like shape. After Nemo wakes up from her nightmare, Carla informs Nemo that her father is now lost at sea. As a result, Carla contacts Nemo's doorknob salesman uncle Philip and persuades him to take Nemo in before she becomes a ward of the state. Philip is shown to lead a monotonous and unfulfilling life.

Nemo is awakened one night when her stuffed pig (named Pig) comes to life, finding herself in Slumberland, the world between dreams. She is carried back to the lighthouse by her animated bed, where she meets Flip, a stubborn and unscrupulous outlaw. Nemo recognizes Flip as the character from the stories her father told. He asks Nemo about a magical map, but she is unaware of it. With no use for Nemo, Flip pushes her off a cliff to wake her up.

Awake, Nemo struggles to adjust to her new life and is an outcast at school as she meets school counselor Ms. Arya and a student named Jamal. Nemo then finds the map in the waking world and manages to take it back to Slumberland, where Flip begrudgingly agrees to take her with him to the pearls so she can wish her father into her dreams.

Flip tells Nemo that he has refused to wake up for so long he no longer remembers who he was when awake. He uses the map as a guide through various dreams to get to the cave. They travel through multiple dreams of different people and are attacked by a cloud of smoke resembling a kraken, a personification of the nightmare of Nemo's father being taken by the same creature. The duo also find themselves being chased down by Agent Green of the Bureau of Subconscious Activities (BoSA), who wants to imprison Flip for never waking up and intruding dreams. They use more dreams to flee Green, but are eventually caught. Green locks Flip up and warns Nemo that she cannot control her dreams before waking her up.

In the waking world, Philip shows Nemo an old video tape of him and Peter as children playing together. Nemo realizes that Flip is Philip's dream alter-ego. As Flip has not woken up, Philip remains docile and unadventurous in the waking world. Nemo borrows Philip's lock-picking tools and goes to Slumberland to rescue Flip from the BoSA. The two use more dreams to flee Green, finding their way back to the lighthouse. Nemo tells Flip who he is, and he rebukes this, stating that he will never wake up. Before she can dive into the ocean to find the pearls, Nemo is awakened and torn out of Slumberland by Ms. Arya. When Philip is called in, Ms. Arya reports on Nemo's progress in school. This leads to an argument between Nemo and Philip.

That night, Nemo sneaks out of Philip's apartment and sails through rough water back to the lighthouse in the waking world. She hits her head and passes out in the boat, sending her back into Slumberland. In the Sea of Nightmares, Nemo acquires a wishing pearl, but is chased by the nightmare. Flip arrives to save her in an airplane and they crash their way through the various dreams from earlier which also awakens their inhabitants. In the waking world, Nemo slips off the small sailboat and into the water. Philip arranges a rescue boat manned by Carla and two co-workers and heads towards the lighthouse, terrified by the storm. The nightmare grabs Flip and Nemo uses her wish to force Flip to wake up. In the waking world, Philip is emboldened and dives into the water to rescue Nemo, who is unconscious.

In Slumberland, Green finds Nemo and commends her on using her wish to save Flip. Green tells Nemo to squeeze Pig and it turns out Pig actually swallowed two pearls. Nemo uses the second pearl and wishes to see her father again. Peter appears and the two spend some quality time together before he tells Nemo he is proud of her and that life is waiting for her in the waking world. Nemo says goodbye to her father and wakes up, where Phillip embraces her, now embedded with the personality of Flip.

Nemo begins to improve her life in the waking world, making friends at school and repairing her relationship with her uncle as they make use of one of Peter's boats for sailing.

Cast
 Marlow Barkley as Nemo, a young girl who has dreams of Slumberland. The character is a boy in the 1900s comic strip.
 Abigail White works as Nemo's photo double.
 Jason Momoa as Flip, a con artist with sharp teeth and the ears and horns of a goat who becomes Nemo's companion and was a former friend of Nemo's father Peter. The character is a clown in the 1900s comic strip.
 Chris O'Dowd as Philip, Nemo's uncle who works as a doorknob salesman who is the waking world counterpart of Flip.
 Cameron Nicoll as young Phillip
 Kyle Chandler as Peter, Nemo's father and former lighthouse keeper who gets lost at sea.
 Antonio Rane Pastore as young Peter.
 Weruche Opia as Agent Green, an operative of the Bureau of Subconscious Activities who Flip has been eluding.
 India de Beaufort as Ms. Arya, the school counselor at Nemo's school.
 Ali Asghar Shah as Afi, 
 Yanna McIntosh as Carla, a friend of Peter and Nemo.
 Izaak Smith as a Canadian guy who dreams about riding a giant Canada goose
 Michael Blake as an accountant whose dreams have him with more hair
 Humberly González as Graciela, a nun who dreams about being a salsa dancer.
 Ava Cheung as Ho-Sook
 Leslie Adlam as Agent Brown, an operative of the Bureau of Subconscious Activities.
 Jamillah Ross as Agent Orange, an operative of the Bureau of Subconscious Activities.
 Tonya Cornelisse as Agent Red, an operative of the Bureau of Subconscious Activities.
 Katerina Taxia as Janice, a lunch lady.

Production

Development and casting
On March 3, 2020, it was announced that Jason Momoa would star in a live-action adaptation of the comic strip series Little Nemo in Slumberland by Winsor McCay from director Francis Lawrence, with Netflix distributing and production starting in the summer of that same year. However, due to the COVID-19 pandemic, filming for the project was postponed. On October 12, 2020, Kyle Chandler joined the cast of the film, where Chris O'Dowd and Marlow Barkley had already been confirmed to star. The following year, on February 18, Weruche Opia and India de Beaufort were cast.

Filming
Filming began on February 18, 2021, in Toronto, and concluded on May 19, 2021.

Post-production
Pinar Toprak composed the musical score. DNEG and Framestore provided the visual effects. Additional VFX was done by Scanline VFX, Ghost VFX, Important Looking Pirates, Outpost VFX, Rodeo FX, Incessant Rain Studios. and Pinscreen, which did AI VFX. The film's main and end titles were done by Imaginary Forces.

Release
Slumberland was released on November 18, 2022, by Netflix. In its first week of release Slumberland was the fifth most streamed program for the week of November 21–27 accruing over 1 billion minutes viewed across the platform.

Reception

Accolades
The film was nominated for two awards (Outstanding Animated Character in a Photoreal Feature & Outstanding Created Environment in a Photoreal Feature) at the 21st Visual Effects Society Awards.

See also
 Little Nemo: Adventures in Slumberland

References

External links
 
 

2022 films
2022 adventure films
2022 fantasy films
2020s American films
2020s English-language films
2020s fantasy adventure films
American fantasy adventure films
Chernin Entertainment films
English-language Netflix original films
Film productions suspended due to the COVID-19 pandemic
Films about dreams
Films based on comic strips
Films based on works by Winsor McCay
Films directed by Francis Lawrence
Films produced by Peter Chernin
Films scored by Pinar Toprak
Films shot in Toronto
Little Nemo
Live-action films based on comics
Magic realism films
Films about grieving